The 1959 Michigan State Spartans football team represented Michigan State University in the 1959 Big Ten Conference football season. In their sixth season under head coach Duffy Daugherty, the Spartans compiled a 5–4 overall record (4–3 against Big Ten opponents), finished in second place in the Big Ten Conference, and were ranked #16 in the final Coaches Poll.

Quarterback Dean Look was selected by the Associated Press (AP) as a first-team player on the 1959 All-Big Ten Conference football team. Three other Spartans were selected for the third team: halfback Herb Adderly; tackle Palmer Pyle; and center Dave Manders.

The 1959 Spartans won all three of their annual rivalry games. In the annual Indiana–Michigan State football rivalry game, the Spartans defeated the Hoosiers by a 14 to 6 score. In the Notre Dame rivalry game, the Spartans defeated the Fighting Irish by a 19 to 0 score.  And, in the annual Michigan–Michigan State football rivalry game, the Spartans defeated the Wolverines by a 34 to 8 score. In non-conference play, the Spartans lost to Texas A&M, 9–7, and the Miami Hurricanes, 18–13.

Schedule

References

Michigan State
Michigan State Spartans football seasons
Michigan State Spartans football